A branch president is a leader of a "branch" congregation of the Church of Jesus Christ of Latter-day Saints (LDS Church).

The calling of branch president is very similar to the calling of bishop, except that instead of presiding over a ward, the branch president presides over a branch. The branch president is directly responsible for the operation of his branch and the well-being of its patrons. The branch president usually has two counselors to assist him in his duties. These three men comprise the branch presidency.  Like almost all callings in the LDS Church, the branch president is not paid for his work in the church.

A branch president must hold the priesthood and at a minimum must hold the office of priest. Unlike a bishop, a branch president is not required to be married or be a high priest, but conforming with these stipulations may depend on whether the branch is part of a district or a stake. In branches within stakes that contain several priesthood holders a branch president will usually be married and may be ordained to the office of high priest. In branches where no resident member is a worthy priesthood holder, a full-time missionary may be called to be branch president.

Branch presidents are given the honorific title "President".

References

Leadership positions in the Church of Jesus Christ of Latter-day Saints
Presidents in the Church of Jesus Christ of Latter-day Saints